The 1953 NBA playoffs was the postseason tournament of the National Basketball Association's 1952–53 season. The tournament concluded with the Western Conference champion Minneapolis Lakers defeating the Eastern Conference champion New York Knicks 4 games to 1 in the NBA Finals.

The Lakers won their fourth championship in the last five years, and defeated the Knicks in the Finals for the second straight season to complete their run.

Not only did the four Western Division teams meet for the third straight year, but the Eastern Division teams this year, had a slight change. The Philadelphia Warriors did not make the playoffs, but the Baltimore Bullets did. They would be swept by the Eastern Division champion New York Knicks in 2 games.

The Indianapolis Olympians played their last game, a Game 2 loss to the Lakers in the first round. They folded at the end of the season, and major professional basketball did not return to Indianapolis, Indiana until the Indiana Pacers were founded for the inaugural 1967–68 season of the American Basketball Association.

The Boston Celtics earned their first playoff series victory with a two-game sweep of the Syracuse Nationals.

The 1952–53 Baltimore Bullets hold the distinction of having the worst regular-season record of any playoff qualifier in league history, at 16-54.

Bracket

Division Semifinals

Eastern Division Semifinals

(1) New York Knicks vs. (4) Baltimore Bullets

This was the third playoff meeting between these two teams, with each team splitting the first two meetings.

(2) Syracuse Nationals vs. (3) Boston Celtics

 Al Cervi’s final NBA game.

This was the first playoff meeting between these two teams.

Western Division Semifinals

(1) Minneapolis Lakers vs. (4) Indianapolis Olympians

This was the third playoff meeting between these two teams, with the Lakers winning the first two meetings.

(2) Rochester Royals vs. (3) Fort Wayne Pistons

This was the fourth playoff meeting between these two teams, with the Royals winning two of the first three meetings.

Division Finals

Eastern Division Finals

(1) New York Knicks vs. (3) Boston Celtics

This was the third playoff meeting between these two teams, with the Knicks winning the first two meetings.

Western Division Finals

(1) Minneapolis Lakers vs. (3) Fort Wayne Pistons

This was the second playoff meeting between these two teams, with the Lakers winning the first meeting.

NBA Finals: (W1) Minneapolis Lakers vs. (E1) New York Knicks

This was the second playoff meeting between these two teams, with the Lakers winning the first meeting.

References

External links
Basketball-Reference.com's 1953 NBA Playoffs page

National Basketball Association playoffs
Playoffs

fi:NBA-kausi 1952–1953#Pudotuspelit